Ivor Arthur Davies, AM (born 22 May 1955), known professionally as Iva Davies, is an Australian singer, songwriter, composer, multi-instrumentalist and record producer. 

Davies' music career spans more than 40 years. He came to prominence in the early 1980s as co-founder and lead singer of rock band Icehouse, becoming one of Australia's top rock stars of that decade. He is the only member who has been with Icehouse throughout its entire history.

In addition to his work with Icehouse, Davies has made music for television series and films, most notably as the composer for the film Master and Commander: The Far Side of the World. He has also had a solo career which included work on the soundtrack album The Berlin Tapes with Icehouse.

Early life
Davies was born on 22 May 1955 in Wauchope, New South Wales and was first attracted to bagpipes at the age of six. He played oboe with the Sydney Youth Orchestra and was a member of the Epping Boys High School Band where he also played the euphonium. He went on to be an oboe and composition student at the New South Wales Conservatorium of Music, but dropped out at age 21 to pursue a professional career.

Three floors down in the YMCA Basement in Sydney was a regular folk and acoustic music venue which featured artists such as Bob Hudson, Mike McClellan, Al Ward, Pat and Geoff Drummond, Al Head, Marion Henderson, Margret RoadKnight and Graham Lowndes. Davies was influenced by the music.

Career

1970s
Davies first performed professionally as a 16-year-old musician with the Lucy Fields Jug Band, led by Lindsay Campbell around 1971/72. The band secured a recording contract with M7 Records, but the company changed hands shortly thereafter and the band's album was never released. In 1974, Davies performed Handel's Concerto for Oboe in E♭ major with Strathfield Symphony Orchestra, conducted by Richard Gill. Davies would later use his woodwind skills on some tracks with his band Icehouse, playing oboe on several albums and adding cor anglais to "Man of Colours", the title track of their sixth studio album.

In July 1975 Davies released his first single, “Leading Lady” on the RCA label.

In early 1977, Davies was working as a part-time cleaner at a squash court in Lindfield, New South Wales managed by bass player Keith Welsh's mother. Davies and Welsh got together to form the band Flowers, rehearsing in a house next door to same squash court. In 1977, Davies re-established an old acquaintance with Cameron Allan, the director of Sydney-based independent label Regular Records, and Flowers signed with the label in early 1977. And in 1980 their debut album Icehouse containing the song "Can't Help Myself" reached the Top Five, making it the highest-selling debut album in Australia. To take advantage of this success, the band changed its name to Icehouse in 1981. The name was taken from a cold flat Davies lived in and the strange building across the road populated by itinerant people.

1980s
In 1983, Davies with Icehouse went on a European tour with David Bowie.

In 1985, Davies and fellow Icehouse member Bob Kretschmer worked on the ballet Boxes with the Sydney Dance Company. In addition to scoring the ballet, they also co-wrote the script with Graeme Murphy. Boxes opened at the Sydney Opera House in December, and Davies performed in an acting/singing/dancing role to sold-out crowds for three weeks straight.

1985 also saw Davies win an APRA Music Award for Most Performed Australasian Music for Film for Razorback. Davies was an early adopter of the Fairlight which he used to compose the music of the film. His score has been described as "pioneering" and "an important contribution to Australian film scoring".

In 1988, Davies and co-collaborator John Oates won an APRA Music Award for the Icehouse song "Electric Blue" (from the Man of Colours album) in the Most Performed Australasian Popular Work category. On 25 January 1988, Icehouse performed "Electric Blue" at the Royal Command, New South Wales Bicentennial Concert in front of the Prince and Princess of Wales at the Sydney Entertainment Centre.

1990s
In the early 1990s, the Sydney Dance Company worked on creating a work which became the ballet Berlin. As well as recording the score to the ballet, Davies performed these songs live with Icehouse at each show. He was an intrinsic part of the ballet, in a role similar to the one he played in Boxes. He was successful in creating a translation from the dancers to the audience. Berlin was an instant success and ran for two seasons.

2000s
In 2003, Davies travelled to Los Angeles to record the soundtrack to the Peter Weir film Master and Commander: The Far Side of the World with Christopher Gordon and Richard Tognetti. Together, they won the 2004 APRA/AGSC Screen Music Award in the Best Soundtrack Album category.

In 2005, Davies scored the mini-series The Incredible Journey of Mary Bryant. On 6 November 2006, he won the 2006 APRA/AGSC Screen Music Award in the Best Music for a Mini-Series or Telemovie category. From 15 June 2008, Davies was a judge on Seven Network TV series Battle of the Choirs; his band Icehouse performed "Great Southern Land" on the grand final show won by University of Newcastle Chamber Choir.

Personal life
Davies currently lives in Whale Beach, New South Wales. He married Tonia Kelly in 1990, then principal dancer at the Sydney Dance Company, but divorced in 2010. From the marriage he has two children, Brynn (born 1993) and Evan (born 1996).

Discography

Albums

Awards and nominations
In 2013, Davis was honoured in the Queen's Birthday Honours as a "Member (AM) in the General Division" for services to music, entertainment and the community

APRA Awards
The APRA Awards are held in Australia and New Zealand by the Australasian Performing Right Association to recognise songwriting skills, sales and airplay performance by its members annually.

|-
| 1986
| Razorback 
| Most Performed Australasian Music for Film	
| 
|-
| 1989
| "Electric Blue" (Iva Davies, John Oates) by Icehouse
| Most Performed Australasian Popular Work	
| 
|-
|rowspan="2" | 2004
|rowspan="2" | Master and Commander: The Far Side of the World (Iva Davies, Christopher Gordon, Richard Tognetti)
| Best Feature Film Score
| 
|-
| Best Soundtrack Album
| 
|-
| 2006
| The Incredible Journey of Mary Bryant (Iva Davis)
| Best Music for a Mini-Series or Telemovie
| 
|}

ARIA Music Awards
The ARIA Music Awards is an annual awards ceremony that recognises excellence, innovation, and achievement across all genres of Australian music. They commenced in 1987. 

! 
|-
| 1996
| The Berlin Tapes
|rowspan="2" | Best Original Soundtrack, Cast or Show Album
| 
|rowspan="2" | 
|-
| 2000
| The Ghost of Time
| 
|-

Australian Songwriter's Hall of Fame
The Australian Songwriters Hall of Fame was established in 2004 to honour the lifetime achievements of some of Australia's greatest songwriters.

|-
| 2018
| himself
| Australian Songwriter's Hall of Fame
| 
|}

TV Week / Countdown Awards
Countdown was an Australian pop music TV series on national broadcaster ABC-TV from 1974 to 1987; it presented music awards from 1979 to 1987, initially in conjunction with magazine TV Week. The TV Week / Countdown Awards were a combination of popular-voted and peer-voted awards.

|-
| 1980
| himself
| Best Recorded Songwriter
| 
|-
| rowspan="3" | 1982
| rowspan="2" | himself
| Best Songwriter
| 
|-
| Best Australian Producer
| 
|-
| himself
| Most Popular Male Performer
| 
|-
| 1984
| himself
| Most Popular Male Performer
| 
|-

References

External links
Flowers – Icehouse The new official website as of April 2011
Spellbound – Icehouse News, interviews, discography, photo gallery

1955 births
APRA Award winners
Living people
Icehouse (band) members
Sydney Conservatorium of Music alumni
Australian electronic musicians
Australian new wave musicians
Australian rock singers
Australian singer-songwriters
Musicians from New South Wales
Australian rock guitarists
Australian multi-instrumentalists
Members of the Order of Australia
Australian people of Welsh descent
People educated at Epping Boys High School
Singers from Sydney
Synth-pop singers
20th-century Australian musicians
21st-century Australian musicians
Rock oboists
Australian male guitarists
Australian male singer-songwriters